Rising from the Sea is the second studio album by the German thrash metal band Exumer. It was released on 21 July 1987 through Disaster Records. The album was produced by Tommy Ziegler and Exumer at Zuckerfabrik Studio in Stuttgart.

Track listing

Personnel 
 Paul Arakari – vocals, bass
 Ray Mensh – guitar
 Bernie Siedler – guitar, backing vocals
 Syke Bornetto – drums
 Tommy Ziegler – producer

References 

1987 albums
Exumer albums
Disaster Records albums